Anil Srinivasan (born 3 June 1977) is an Indian pianist. Born in Chennai, India and educated at the University of Southern California and at Columbia University, New York, he is well known for his collaborative work with Carnatic vocalist Sikkil Gurucharan and for his pioneering work in music education in South India. Anil Srinivasan was awarded Kalaimamani by government of Tamil Nadu for the year 2019.

Early life
Anil Srinivasan was born to a Brahmin family. He was brought up in a South Indian traditional atmosphere with Carnatic music all around right from childhood and has studied western classical piano since the age of three.

Music

Solo work

Anil has performed at various venues across the world including those at the Kaplan Penthouse at the Lincoln Center in New York, the Southbank Centre in London, the Esplanade in Singapore, The Harbourfront Centre in Toronto and The Ashram in Pondicherry, South India. Anil’s solo work marries the Indian classical with the western classical styles. His solo album TOUCH was released in 2015.

Collaborative work
Anil Srinivasan has collaborated with many well known classical musicians such as Mandolin U. Srinivas, Umayalpuram K. Sivaraman, P. Unnikrishnan, Chitravina N. Ravikiran, Aruna Sairam, Rakesh Chaurasia, Gaurav Mazumdar, The Lalgudi duo, Jayanthi Kumaresh, Mysore Nagaraj,
film actress and Bharata Natyam dancer Shobana, Supratik Das and others. He has also worked with prominent film musicians such as Singer Srinivas (singer), Chinmayi, Saindhavi, Shweta Mohan, Naresh Iyer, Madhu Balakrishnan, Harini, Anuradha Sriram, Navin Iyer and others.

Through his collaboration with vocalist Sikkil Gurucharan, includes 6 published albums and several national and international tours.

He is also known for having organized alternative performing arts platforms and festivals such as the Festival of Parallels, an annual festival in the city of Chennai, the Children's Musical Rhapsody(an annual children's arts festival). and his television show "Keys and Conversations" on NDTV-Hindu, co-anchored with Anuradha Ananth. He regularly works and records with noted vocalist and composer Vedanth Bharadwaj. Anil has also worked with UK-based Milapfest in cross-cultural educational projects.

Internationally, he has worked with the Eli Yamin Jazz Quartet (from the US), Pete Lockett (Percussion), Dominique DiPiazza, Randy Bernsen (Guitar), Mark Stone in a recent collaborative performance, members of the National Traditional Performing Arts repertory in Korea (where he was invited as an Artist-In-Residence).

He has worked with well-known dancers including the Dhananjayans, Ramli Ibrahim from Malaysia, Anita Ratnam, Anandavalli (Australia) and the Lingalayam Dance Company, among others. He composes and scores music for several productions in the theatrical space as well. In 2013, Anil embarked on a project with the Southbank Centre's famed Alchemy Festival, where he has trained teachers of Western Classical music in the nuances and pedagogy of Indian music in classrooms.

Music education

For children
Anil is passionate about music education for children across all strata of society. In 2012, Anil founded Rhapsody – Education Through Music. Rhapsody now reaches over 400,000 children in South India. His work with setting up initiatives for children from different backgrounds is evident through his association with NalandaWay, an NGO that strives tirelessly to provide arts-based educational inputs to children from difficult backgrounds.

For adults
Anil Srinivasan is also a speaker on music and its effect on human behavior, organizational processes and related topics at various forums. He continues to write about music for various publications and media.

Writing
He has written extensively on music for several leading dailies The Hindu, The New Indian Express, The Times of India, Deccan Chronicle, magazines and periodicals. He speaks regularly at conferences related to music, education and entrepreneurship and has been featured at prominent conclaves such as TED INDIA and THINK festivals.

Awards and recognition 
1989 - Rachel Morgan Prize - Best Pianist in the Commonwealth

2009 - Ustad Bismillah Khan Yuva Puraskar for creative and experimental music from the central Sangeet Natak Akademi.

2010 - Ritz Icon - South India]

2013 - Swami Haridas Puraskar, Vrindavan, India

2017 - Ken Hobbs Citation for Social Responsibility by Rotary Foundation

2017 - Pride of Tamil Nadu by Round Table India

2019 - Kalaimamani by Government of Tamilnadu

Television

Compositions and commissions

Various theatre projects (1997–present) 
 Guide (Teamwork Productions, Delhi, 2012)
 Sita’s Magical Forest] (Apsaras Arts and The Esplanade Theatre Company, Singapore, 2012)
 Chasing My Mamet Duck (2011)
 Barefoot in the Part (Evam, 2003)

Dance works
 Seven Graces (With Anita Ratnam)
 Aasai Mugham (With Ramli Ibrahim)
 Tapasya (With Rajika Puri)
 Karadi Tales (The Mouse Series, 2009)
 Karadi Tales (A Quiet Courage, 2012)

Discography
   Into the Light (2002) with Mandolin U Rajesh
   Spirits (2003) with U Rajesh,  Pete Lockett and others
  Madhirakshi (2006) with Sikkil Gurucharan, Charsur
  Maayaa (2007) with Sikkil Gurucharan, Charsur
  The Blue Divine (2009) with Sikkil Gurucharan, Kalakendra
 Tarunam (2010) with Sikkil Gurucharan, Kalakendra
  Flame of the Forest (2009)  with Chitravina Ravikiran, Kalakendra
  Kannamma (2009), with various artists, For Nalandaway (Kalakendra)
  Eternal Light (2010) with Lalgudi Krishnan, Felmay, Italy
   Samjhanitha (2007) with U Shrinivas and various other artists, Sony Dreyfus
  The Story of Silk (2012) with Sikkil Gurucharan, Silkworm
   Live at the Peninsula (2012) With Sikkil Gurucharan, The Peninsula Studio
  Keys to India (2013), solo with featured guest artists

Residencies 
   Music India, Milapfest (2011,  2012, 2013, 2014, 2015)
   Southbank Centre, London  (2013)
   National Centre for the Traditional Performing Arts, Korea (2011)
   The Lingalayam Dance Company,  Sydney, Australia in association with the Parammatta Arts Council (2010)

External links
http://www.sabhash.com/artist/73/anil-srinivasan.htm
http://www.mtv.com/artists/anil-srinivasan/biography//
http://www.thehindu.com/life-and-style/article63668.ece

References

Living people
1977 births
Indian classical pianists
Indian music educators
Musicians from Chennai
USC Thornton School of Music alumni
Columbia University alumni
21st-century classical pianists
Pianist from India